is a Shinto shrine located in Tsuno, Miyazaki prefecture, Japan. It is dedicated to Ōkuninushi.

Shinto shrines in Miyazaki Prefecture
Beppyo shrines